The Belfast Charity Cup was a football competition which ran from 1883 to 1941, and was based on a similar tournament in Scotland, the Glasgow Merchants Charity Cup. The competition was open to senior sides from Belfast and invited intermediate teams.

The last tournament was played in 1940. The following year, instead of the tournament being played, the holders Belfast Celtic played a representative match against players with cross-channel experience. The representative team won 3-1.

List of finals

Performance by club

Sources
Malcolm Brodie, "100 Years of Irish Football", Blackstaff Press, Belfast (1980)

References

External links
Irish League Archive - Belfast Charity Cup

Defunct association football cup competitions in Northern Ireland